Helge Schwarzer (born 26 November 1985 in Gehrden) is a retired German athlete who specialised in the sprint hurdles. He represented his country at one outdoor and two indoor World Championships.

His personal bests are 13.39 seconds in the 110 metres hurdles (+0.7 m/s, Ulm 2009) and 7.58 seconds in the 60 metres hurdles (Kirchberg 2012).

International competitions

1Did not finish in the semifinals

References

1985 births
Living people
German male hurdlers
People from Gehrden
World Athletics Championships athletes for Germany
Sportspeople from Lower Saxony